Irene Worth, CBE (June 23, 1916March 10, 2002) was an American stage and screen actress who became one of the leading stars of the British and American theatre. She pronounced her given name with three syllables: "I-REE-nee".

Worth made her Broadway debut in 1943, joined the Old Vic company in 1951 and the Royal Shakespeare Company in 1962. She won the BAFTA Award for Best British Actress for the 1958 film Orders to Kill. Her other film appearances included Nicholas and Alexandra (1971) and Deathtrap (1982). A three-time Tony Award winner, she won the Tony Award for Best Actress in a Play for Tiny Alice in 1965 and Sweet Bird of Youth in 1976, and won the 1991 Tony Award for Best Featured Actress in a Play for Lost in Yonkers, a role she reprised in the 1993 film version. One of her later stage performances was opposite Paul Scofield in the 2001 production of I Take Your Hand in Mine at the Almeida Theatre in London.

Early life
Harriett Elizabeth Abrams was born in Fairbury, Nebraska, the eldest of three children born to Mennonite parents, Heinrich "Henry" Abrams (who was born in Russia) and Agnes ( Thiessen) Abrams, both teachers. The family moved from Nebraska to Southern California in 1920. She was educated at Newport Harbor High School, Santa Ana Junior College, and UCLA. In 1944, she settled in London, where she remained for much of her career.

Career

Shakespeare and the West End
She joined the Old Vic company in 1951, worked with Tyrone Guthrie and there played Desdemona, Helena in A Midsummer Night's Dream, Portia in The Merchant of Venice and her first Lady Macbeth. The company went to South Africa with Worth as one of the leading ladies.

In 1953, she joined the fledgling Shakespeare Festival in Stratford, Ontario for its inaugural season. There she was the principal leading lady, performing under an enormous tent with Alec Guinness in All's Well That Ends Well and Richard III. 

She returned to London in N.C. Hunter's "Chekhovian" drama A Day by the Sea, with a cast that included John Gielgud and Ralph Richardson. She joined the Midland Theatre Company in Coventry for Ugo Betti's The Queen and the Rebels. Her transformation from "a rejected slut cowering at her lover's feet into a redemption of regal poise" ensured a transfer to London, where Kenneth Tynan wrote of her technique: "It is grandiose, heartfelt, marvellously controlled, clear as crystal and totally unmoving."

In the 1950s, Worth demonstrated her exceptional versatility by playing in the farce Hotel Paradiso in London with Alec Guinness, high tragedy in the title role of Schiller's Mary Stuart, co-starring Eva Le Gallienne, and on Broadway and Shakespearean comedy in As You Like It at Stratford, Ontario. In Ivor Brown's play William's Other Anne, she played Shakespeare's first girlfriend Anne Whateley opposite John Gregson as Shakespeare.

She also made a number of well-regarded appearances in British films of the period, most notably her powerful performance as a French Resistance agent in Anthony Asquith's 1958 wartime espionage drama Orders to Kill, which earned her the BAFTA award for Best Supporting Actress.

The RSC, the National Theatre and Greenwich 
In 1962, she joined the Royal Shakespeare Company at the Aldwych Theatre, and it was there that she gave some of her great performances. She was Goneril to Paul Scofield's Lear in Peter Brook's acclaimed King Lear, the first of many collaborations with Brook. She recreated her implacable Goneril in the stark, black-and-white film version of this production. 

She repeated her Lady Macbeth and appeared again for Brook in Friedrich Dürrenmatt's The Physicists. Playing an asylum superintendent, she showed the darker side of her acting. She then went to New York City in 1965 for the opening of Edward Albee's enigmatic Tiny Alice, in which she co-starred with Sir John Gielgud and which won her the first of her three Tony Awards.

She returned to the RSC at the Aldwych to repeat her role. She worked with Peter Brook in Paris and toured Iran with Orghast, Brook's attempt to develop an international theatre language. She joined the National Theatre at the Old Vic in 1968 to play Jocasta in Peter Brook's production of Seneca's Oedipus, opposite Gielgud. She appeared with Sir Noël Coward's in his trilogy, Suite in Three Keys, in which he made his last on-stage appearance.

In 1974, she appeared in three thematically linked plays at the Greenwich Theatre directed by Jonathan Miller under the umbrella title of Family Romances and using the same actors for each play. Worth took the roles of Gertrude in Hamlet, Madame Arkadina in Chekhov's The Seagull, and Mrs Alving in Ibsen's Ghosts.

America
Worth spent most of the 1970s in North America. She was an acclaimed Hedda Gabler at Stratford, Ontario, a role she considered one of her more satisfying achievements and which prompted Walter Kerr to write in The New York Times "Miss Worth is just possibly the best actress in the world."

She played Princess Kosmonopolis in Tennessee Williams's Sweet Bird of Youth opposite Christopher Walken, which brought her a second Tony Award. She was Madame Ranevskaya in The Cherry Orchard, for which she received another Tony nomination and which featured Raúl Juliá, Mary Beth Hurt and Meryl Streep, whose career was in its beginning stages. Toward the end of the decade she played Winnie in Beckett's Happy Days.

Worth also appeared in the premiere of The Lady from Dubuque, another Albee play, which closed after 12 performances; a revival of Ibsen's John Gabriel Borkman; Toys in the Attic by Lillian Hellman; and The Golden Age by A.R. Gurney.

The later years
She starred as the goddess Athena in The National Radio Theater's 1981 Peabody Award-winning radio drama of The Odyssey of Homer. On screen in 1982, Worth co-starred with Michael Caine and Christopher Reeve in the film version of a Broadway murder mystery Deathtrap, playing a psychic.

In 1984, Sir Peter Hall invited her to return to the National Theatre to play Volumnia in Coriolanus, with Sir Ian McKellen in the title role. The impresario Joseph Papp persuaded her to repeat Volumnia off-Broadway in a production by Steven Berkoff, when she again was partnered by Christopher Walken as Coriolanus. 

She was seen in Sir David Hare's The Bay at Nice (National, 1987) and in Chère Maître (New York, 1998 and Almeida, London 1999), compiled by Peter Eyre from the letters of George Sand and Gustave Flaubert. Worth also starred along with Sir Michael Hordern in George Bernard Shaw's play You Never Can Tell at the Theatre Royal, Haymarket in 1987 and 1988.

In 1991, she won a third Tony for her performance as the tough-as-nails Grandma Kurnitz in Neil Simon's Lost in Yonkers, and later appeared in the film version along with Richard Dreyfuss and Mercedes Ruehl.

In 1999, she appeared in the film Onegin. As she was about to begin preview performances in a Broadway revival of Anouilh's Ring Round the Moon, Worth had a stroke and never appeared in the production. She continued to act, and in September 2001, one of her later appearances was with Paul Scofield at the Almeida Theatre in the two-handed play I Take Your Hand in Mine, by Carol Rocamora based on the love letters of Anton Chekhov and Olga Knipper.

Recitals
During the mid-1960s in New York, Worth and Gielgud had collaborated in a series of dramatic readings, first from T.S. Eliot and Edith Sitwell and then from Shakespeare. It was a form of theatre at which she became more adept as she grew older, drawing from Virginia Woolf, Ivan Turgenev and Noël Coward. She referred to them as "her recitals". 

In the mid-1990s, she devised and performed a two-hour monologue Portrait of Edith Wharton, based on Wharton's life and writings. Using no props, costumes or sets, she created characters entirely through vocal means.

Death and funeral
 
She died in 2002, aged 85, following a second stroke in New York's Roosevelt Hospital, at the age of 85. She was survived by her two younger siblings, Luther and Carol, and various nieces and nephews. 

At her memorial service, held at the Public Theater in New York City, numerous speakers paid tribute to her, including Edward Albee, Christopher Walken, Mercedes Ruehl, Gene Saks, Meryl Streep, Bernard Gersten, Alan Rickman, and pianist Horacio Gutierrez performed Liszt’s Sonetto 104 del Petrarca.

Awards
 Daily Mail Television Award The Lady from the Sea, 1953-54
 British Film Academy Award Best British Actress, Orders to Kill 1958
 Page One Award, Toys in the Attic 1960
 Tony Award for Best Actress (Dramatic), Tiny Alice 1965
 Evening Standard Award, Suite in Three Keys 1966
 Variety Club of Great Britain Award, Heartbreak House 1967
 Plays and Players London Theatre Critics Award Best Actress, Heartbreak House 1967
 Tony Award for Best Actress, Sweet Bird of Youth 1975-76
 Joseph Jefferson Award Best Actress in a Play, Sweet Bird of Youth 1975-76
 Drama Desk Award for Outstanding Actress, The Cherry Orchard 1977
 OBIE Award, The Chalk Garden 1981-82
 Emmy Award, "Live From Lincoln Center: Chamber Music Society of Lincoln Center with Irene Worth and Horacio Gutiérrez" 1986
 OBIE Award, Sustained Achievement 1988-89
 Tony Award for Best Featured Actress, Lost in Yonkers 1991
 Drama Desk Award for Outstanding Featured Actress, Lost in Yonkers 1991

Honors
Worth was awarded an honorary Commander of the Order of the British Empire (CBE) in 1975.

Filmography
 One Night with You (1948) as Lina Linari (film debut)
 Another Shore (1948) as Bucksie Vere-Brown
 Secret People (1952) (with Valentina Cortese and Audrey Hepburn) as Miss Jackson
 Orders to Kill (1958) (with Lillian Gish, directed by Anthony Asquith) as Léonie
 The Scapegoat (1959) (with Alec Guinness and Bette Davis) as Francoise
 Seven Seas to Calais (1962) (with Rod Taylor) as Queen Elizabeth I
 To Die in Madrid (1963, documentary) as Co-Narrator
 King Lear (1971) (with Paul Scofield) as Goneril
 Nicholas and Alexandra (1971) (with Janet Suzman, Michael Jayston, Laurence Olivier, Jack Hawkins, Michael Redgrave and Harry Andrews) as The Queen Mother Marie Fedorovna
 Rich Kids (1979) as Madeline's Mother
 Happy Days (play) (1980, TV Movie) as Winnie
 Eyewitness (1981, directed by Peter Yates) (with William Hurt, Sigourney Weaver and Christopher Plummer) as Mrs. Sokolow
 Deathtrap (1982) (with Michael Caine, Christopher Reeve and Dyan Cannon, directed by Sidney Lumet) as Helga ten Dorp
 Separate Tables (1983, TV Movie, directed by John Schlesinger) (with Julie Christie, Alan Bates and Claire Bloom) as 
 The Tragedy of Coriolanus (1984, TV Movie, directed by Elijah Moshinsky) as Volumnia
 Forbidden (1984) as Ruth Friedländer
 Fast Forward (1985, directed by Sidney Poitier) as Ida Sabol
 Lost in Yonkers (1993, directed by Martha Coolidge) (with Richard Dreyfuss and Mercedes Ruehl) as Grandma Kurnitz
 Just the Ticket (1998) (with Andy García and Andie MacDowell) as Mrs. Haywood
 Onegin (1999, directed by Martha Fiennes) (with Ralph Fiennes, Toby Stephens and Liv Tyler) as Princess Alina (final film role)

References

External links

1916 births
2002 deaths
Alumni of the Royal Central School of Speech and Drama
American film actresses
American Mennonites
American stage actresses
American television actresses
Best British Actress BAFTA Award winners
Drama Desk Award winners
Emmy Award winners
Honorary Commanders of the Order of the British Empire
Obie Award recipients
People from Manhattan
Royal Shakespeare Company members
American Shakespearean actresses
Tony Award winners
20th-century American actresses
21st-century American actresses
People from Fairbury, Nebraska
Actresses from Nebraska
Actresses from Los Angeles
Newport Harbor High School alumni